The Sensée is a river in northern France that crosses the département of Pas-de-Calais. The source is found at Croisilles and passes through Lécluse. It crosses the Canal du Nord at Arleux, and joins the canalized Escaut at Bouchain. The average descent is 2.42%.

The Sensée has many tributaries: the Cojeul, the Trinquise, the Hirondelle, the Agache and the Naville Tortue.

A 10th-century document refers to the river by the name of Sensada. The origins of the name are unknown.

See also
Canal de la Sensée

References

External links
(All French language)
  Water measuring station on the Sensée
  débits synthétiques sur la Banque HYDRO 
données débits moyens journaliers Année 2004  changer l'année dans la barre d'addresse 
comparaison 2005 / chronologie antérieure disponible  changer l'année dans la barre d'addresse
 Dictionary of rivers and canals of France in Projet Babel 
 General Information from the flood zones atlas

Rivers of France
Rivers of Hauts-de-France
Rivers of the Pas-de-Calais